St. Benedict's Church is a historic Roman Catholic church near Bendena, Kansas.  It was built in 1903.  The church was listed on the National Register of Historic Places in 1998.

It is a gable-fronted red brick building on a limestone block foundation, which was the foundation of the 1895 church which this replaced.

References

Churches in the Roman Catholic Archdiocese of Kansas City in Kansas
Buildings and structures in Doniphan County, Kansas
Churches on the National Register of Historic Places in Kansas
National Register of Historic Places in Doniphan County, Kansas